This is an alphabetical list of villages in Budgam district, Jammu and Kashmir, India.

A—D
 Aarizal
 Aripanthan
 Badran, Jammu and Kashmir
 Bagati Kani Pora
 Beerwah, Jammu and Kashmir 
 Bon makhama
 Chak Dewan Lakhimandass
 Chattergam
 Chewdara
 Choon, Budgam
 Dadina
 Dooniwari

E—H
 Gondipora
 Guda Sathu, Budgam
 Hanji-Bough

I—L
 Ich Kot, Budgam
 Ichgam
 Ichehama
 Iskander Pora, Jammu and Kashmir
 Jawalpora, Budgam
 Kandoora
 Kanihama
 Khag, Jammu and Kashmir
 Lalpora, Jammu and Kashmir

M—P
 Manchama
 Mazhom
 Meerpora
 Mulashulla
 Narawarah
 Ohangam
 Ompora 
 Narkara 
 Otligam
 Peth Zanigam, Jammu and Kashmir
 Pethmakhama
 Purni Suder Shah

Q—T
 Rathsun
 Sechin Banet
 Soibugh
 Sonapah
 sholipora

U—X
 Wahabpora
 Wanihama
 wadwan
 waterhail

Y—Z

Villages in Budgam district
Budgam district